Burlington, also known as Mount Olive, is an unincorporated community located in Elmore County, Alabama, United States.

References 

Unincorporated communities in Elmore County, Alabama
Unincorporated communities in Alabama